The 1912–13 season was the twentieth season in which Dundee competed at a Scottish national level, playing in Division One, where they would finish in 13th place. Dundee would also compete in the Scottish Cup, where they would make it to the Quarter-finals before losing in a 2nd replay to Clyde.

Scottish Division One 

Statistics provided by Dee Archive.

League table

Scottish Cup 

Statistics provided by Dee Archive.

Player Statistics 
Statistics provided by Dee Archive

|}

See also 

 List of Dundee F.C. seasons

References 

 

Dundee F.C. seasons
Dundee